Basketball competitions taking place in 1990

The 1990 FIBA World Championship for Women took place in Kuala Lumpur, Malaysia, and was won by the United States.

Winners of major team competitions 1989–1990

Men 
Europe
 Germany : Bayer Giants Leverkusen
 British BL : Kingston
 Belgium : RC Malines
 Bulgaria : PBC CSKA Sofia
 Spain : FC Barcelona Bàsquet
Saporta Cup : Virtus Pallacanestro Bologna
Euroleague Basketball : KK Split
 France : Limoges CSP
 Greece : Aris B.C.
 Israel : Maccabi Tel Aviv B.C.
 Italy : Victoria Libertas Pesaro
Korać Cup : Victoria Libertas Pesaro
 Poland :  Lech Poznań
 Sweden : Södertälje Kings
 Switzerland : Pully Basket
 Czechoslovakia : BC Brno
 Turkey : Galatasaray S.K.
 USSR : PBC CSKA Moscow
 Yugoslavia : KK Split

Americas
 Argentina : Asociación Deportiva Atenas
 Brazil : Franca BC
 CBA : La Crosse Catbirds
 NBA : Detroit Pistons
 NCAA : UNLV Rebels
 Uruguay : -
 Puerto Rico : Leones de Ponce
 Venezuela : Bravos de Portuguesa

Africa, Asia, Oceania
 Angola : Petro Luanda
 Australia : Perth Wildcats
 Morocco : FUS de Rabat
 New Zealand : Canterbury Rams

Women 

Europe
 Germany : DJK Agon 08 Düsseldorf
 Spain : CB Masnou-Microbank
EuroLeague Women : Trogylos Enimont Priolo
 France : Challes-Les-Eaux
 Italy : Unicar Cesena
 Netherlands : BV Den Helder
 Poland : PZU Polfa Pabianice
Ronchetti Cup : Basket Parma
 Sweden : Arvika Basket
 URSS : Elektrosila Leningrad

Americas
 NCAA : Stanford Cardinal

Africa, Asia, Oceania
 Australie : North Adelaide

Player awards (NBA)

Regular Season MVP 

 Magic Johnson, Los Angeles Lakers

NBA Finals MVP 

 Isiah Thomas, Detroit Pistons

Slam Dunk Contest 

 Dominique Wilkins, Atlanta Hawks

Three-point Shootout 

 Craig Hodges, Chicago Bulls

Collegiate awards
 Men
John R. Wooden Award: Lionel Simmons, La Salle
Naismith College Coach of the Year: Bobby Cremins, Georgia Tech
Frances Pomeroy Naismith Award: Greg "Boo" Harvey, St. John's
Associated Press College Basketball Player of the Year: Lionel Simmons, La Salle
NCAA basketball tournament Most Outstanding Player: Christian Laettner, Duke
USBWA National Freshman of the Year: Kenny Anderson, Georgia Tech
Associated Press College Basketball Coach of the Year: Jim Calhoun, Connecticut
Naismith Outstanding Contribution to Basketball: Frank McGuire
 Women
Naismith College Player of the Year: Jennifer Azzi, Stanford
Naismith College Coach of the Year: Tara VanDerveer, Stanford
Wade Trophy: Jennifer Azzi, Stanford
Frances Pomeroy Naismith Award: Julie Dabrowski, SNHU
NCAA basketball tournament Most Outstanding Player: Jennifer Azzi, Stanford
Carol Eckman Award: Dr. Maryalice Jeremiah, California State, Fullerton

Naismith Memorial Basketball Hall of Fame
Class of 1990:
Dave Bing
Elvin Hayes
Neil Johnston
Earl Monroe

Births

October 21 — Ricky Rubio

Deaths
March 4 — Hank Gathers, American college player (Loyola Marymount) (born 1967)
April 12 — Irving Terjesen, American NBL player (Akron Firestone Non-Skids) (born 1915)
April 22 — Bob Davies, American Hall of Fame player (Rochester Royals) (born 1920)
May 21 — Ed Steitz, American college coach (Springfield) and Hall of Fame NCAA administrator (born 1920)
August 12 — James Stewart, Canadian Olympic silver medalist (1936) (born 1910)
August 31 — Nathaniel Clifton, American player (New York Knicks, Detroit Pistons) (born 1922)
September 28 — Larry O'Brien, third commissioner of the NBA (1975—1984) (born 1917) 
October 7 — John "Cat" Thompson, American Hall of Fame college player (Montana State) (born 1906)
October 11 — Ken Spain, American ABA player (Pittsburgh Condors) and Olympic gold medalist (1968) (born 1946)
October 25 — Bennie Oosterbaan, All-American college player (Michigan) (born 1906)

See also

 1990 in sports

References